Bailie is an English name. Notable people with this name include:

 Given name
 Bailie Key (b. 1999), American gymnast

 Other
 Bailie Nicol Jarvie
 Beijing Bailie University

See also 
 Bailie (surname)
 Baillie (surname)
 Bayly (surname)
 

English-language surnames